Akbarabad-e Hashivar (also Romanized as Akbarābād-e Hashīvār; also known as Akbarābād and Akbarābād-e Bālā) is a village in Hashivar Rural District, in the Central District of Darab County, Fars Province, Iran. At the 2006 census, its population was 383, in 86 families.

References 

Populated places in Darab County